Bogliarka is a village and municipality in Bardejov District in the Prešov Region of north-east Slovakia.

History
In historical records the village was first mentioned in 1454.

Geography
The municipality lies at an altitude of 455 metres and covers an area of 9.391 km2.
It has a population of about 150 people.

Ethnicity
The village is about 88% Slovak 8% Magyar and 4% Ruthenian.

Facilities
The village has a public library and a football pitch.

Genealogical resources
The records for genealogical research are available at the state archive "Statny Archiv in Presov, Slovakia"

 Roman Catholic church records (births/marriages/deaths): 1749-1897 (parish B)
 Greek Catholic church records (births/marriages/deaths): 1819-1938 (parish B)

See also
 List of municipalities and towns in Slovakia

References

External links
 
https://web.archive.org/web/20071116010355/http://www.statistics.sk/mosmis/eng/run.html
Surnames of living people in Bogliarka

Villages and municipalities in Bardejov District
Šariš